Tom Allison (29 February 1944) is a former Australian rules footballer who played for North Melbourne Football Club in the Victorian Football League (VFL). He played 106 games and kicked 61 goals for North Melbourne between 1963–70.

Allison was recruited from West Coburg and played one match for Victoria in 1965. After his retirement, Allison became captain-coach of Canberra Australian National Football League side Belconnen and also played for and coached the Australian Capital Territory. He attended St Kevin's College, Melbourne.

Allison's son Brett also played for North Melbourne.

He is the Uncle of Peter Bosustow

References

1944 births
Living people
North Melbourne Football Club players
Australian rules footballers from Victoria (Australia)
Belconnen Football Club players

People educated at St Kevin's College, Melbourne